Vasily Vasil’yevich Bessel ( April 25 [OS April 13], 1843 (1842?) St Petersburg – March 1, [OS February 16] 1907, Zurich) was a Russian music publisher.

Bessel graduated from the Saint Petersburg Conservatory in 1865 studying violin with Henryk Wieniawski and viola with Hieronymus Weickmann.

He co-founded the thriving publishing firm V. Bessel and Co. (since 1869) and a print shop (since 1871), which published works by prominent Russian composers, notably Pyotr Tchaikovsky, Anton Rubinstein, Alexander Dargomyzhsky and the members of the New Russian Musical School—Modest Musorgsky, Nikolay Rimsky-Korsakov, César Cui, Mily Balakirev, and Alexander Borodin.

He was the journal’s publisher and  also the sole editor of a weekly St Petersburg  magazine “Muzykal’ny listok” [The Musical Leaf] from September 3, 1872 to June 5, 1877, that appeared on Sundays during the nine-month Russian musical season, from September/October to May/June. The journal’s purpose was to offer an in-depth view of the many aspects of Russian and foreign musical life. Later he published the journal “Muzykal’noye obozrenie” [The musical revue] (1885–1888). He also wrote a book; “Notnoe delo” [The Note Matter], published in 1901.

His brother N. V. Bessel was a co-owner of the firm V. Bessel and Co.

External links
 Muzykal’ny listok

Editors from the Russian Empire
1843 births
1907 deaths